Gore Vidal: The United States of Amnesia is a 2013 documentary film about the life and career of author Gore Vidal. It premiered at Tribeca Film Festival in 2013.

Synopsis 
The film is a commentary on Vidal's professional and personal life, and the impact he had in art and politics. It includes exclusive interviews with Vidal, as well as figures such as Burr Steers and Christopher Hitchens.

Cast 
 Gore Vidal
 Jay Parini
 Burr Steers
 Christopher Hitchens
 Jodie Evans
 Tim Robbins
 Mikhail Gorbachev
 Sting
 David Mamet
 Bob Scheer
 William F. Buckley
 Jay Parini
 Norman Mailer
 Nina Straight
 Dick Cavett

Reception 
On review aggregator Rotten Tomatoes, the film holds an approval rating of 83% based on 29 reviews, with an average rating of 6.89/10. On Metacritic, the film has a weighted average score of 72 out of 100, based on 14 critics, indicating "generally favorable reviews".

Awards
The film won the award of Best International Documentary Film at the 2014 Byron Bay Film Festival.

Accolades 
 Audience Award - Palm Springs International Film Festival
 Best Documentary - 16th United Nations Association Film Festival

Festival screenings 
 Tribeca Film Festival (2013)
 Aspen Film Festival (2013)
 Traverse City Film Festival (2013)
 16th United Nations Association Film Festival (2013)

References

External links 
 

2013 films
Documentary films about writers